Jack and Jill: A Postscript is a 1970 Australian film.

Plot
Jill, a kindergarten teacher who lives with her parents, meets Jack, a biker. The two fall in love but are unable to reconcile their differences, with tragic results.

Cast
Anthony Ward as Jack Anderson
Judy Leech as Gillian O'Keefe
Lindsay Howatt as Christopher
Stanley Randall as Stan
Jean Higgs as Mrs Whelan
Phyllis Freeman as Mrs O'Keefe
Alan Higgs as Mr O'Keefe
Gerry Humphries as Gerry
Bob Cornish as television announcer
Gordon Rumph as minister
Sylvia Threlfall as minister's wife
Ray Watts as the singer

Production
The script was originally devised in 1964 as a series of sketches where nursery rhymes provided commentary on modern suburbia. It took several years to film and shooting finished in mid 1969.

Release
The film won a silver award at the 1969 Australian Film Awards and screened at a number of festivals. It was released commercially by Columbia Pictures.

References

External links
Jack and Jill: A Postscript at IMDb
Jack and Jill: A Postscript at Australian Screen Online
Jack and Jill a Postscript at Oz Movies

Australian drama films
1970 films
1970s English-language films
1970s Australian films